New Jersey Cannabis Regulatory and Expungement Aid Modernization Act (S.2703) is proposed legislation to legalize, tax and regulate adult-use cannabis in the U.S. state of New Jersey, and to expunge certain drug-related offenses. A state Senate–Assembly joint committee passed the bill in November 2018 for a vote by both houses. The state governor Phil Murphy indicated support for legalization in his 2017 campaign.

Earlier proposed legislation provided for expungement of cannabis offenses in separate bills from actual legalization. Expungement in the 2018 proposal was "central to gaining support" in the legislature. 

State senator Nicholas Scutari was a primary sponsor of the bill. He also was a primary sponsor of New Jersey S. 119, the Compassionate Use Medical Marijuana Act, which he introduced in January 2005, five years before it was enacted. After "stalling" the bill was revived when legislators and the governor agreed to set a tax rate of $42.00 an ounce vice a percentage of the sale price. The New York Times reported in February, 2019 that the settling of the tax rate question "could place the state [of New Jersey] on a path to legalizing recreational marijuana this year". On March 18, both chambers advanced the bill for a floor vote.

The prospects of this bill in New Jersey are said to be "a litmus test" for New York state.

Legislators and the governor have said if the bill does not pass in March, 2019 they will continue to try to get it passed in the new session beginning in November.

On May 15 it was announced by the Senate president that the bill could not clear the legislature, and would instead become a 2020 voter referendum.

Polling 
On S.2703

On whether recreational marijuana should be legal

Notes

Partisan clients

References

Further reading

External links

Text of bill S.2703

2018 in cannabis
2018 cannabis law reform
New Jersey law
2020 cannabis law reform
2020 New Jersey elections